is a former professional Japanese baseball player.

External links

1967 births
Living people
Baseball people from Fukuoka Prefecture
Japanese baseball players
Nippon Professional Baseball infielders
Hiroshima Toyo Carp players
Japanese baseball coaches
Nippon Professional Baseball coaches